Andy Wilkinson is an American singer-songwriter who writes cowboy poetry. He was the keynote speaker at the 33rd National Cowboy Poetry Gathering.

References

Living people
American singer-songwriters
Year of birth missing (living people)